Tanya Clarke (born February 2, 1972) is an American film, television, and stage actress, known for her role as Nicole Brennan in the Dead Space franchise.

Early life 
Tanya Clarke was born in Chicago, Illinois while her father, Tony Clarke, completed his doctorate degree in Social Ethics at the University of Chicago. The eldest of two children, she was raised in Ottawa, Ontario, Canada. Her mother, Carol Clarke worked as a community organizer and her father, Tony, is a political and environmental activist and writer. Her brother Chris Clarke is a high school teacher and counselor.
Clarke moved to NYC at the age of twenty and spent many years performing on Broadway, Off-Broadway and regional stages. She's engaged to actor Michael Buie and has a daughter, Lola.

Career 

Her film credits include A Beautiful Mind and Tenderness with Russell Crowe, Repo Men (2010), DriverX & Blackbird. She was also in I Can Only Imagine with  Dennis Quaid.

Her television roles include the portrayal of Emily Lotus on Cinemax's Banshee and Queen Reyna on Marvel's Marvel's Inhumans. Other: Grey's Anatomy, first and ninth season of American Horror Story, Glee, Hawaii Five-0, CSI: Miami, Supernatural, and Major Crimes.

She made her Broadway debut in I'm Not Rappaport opposite Judd Hirsch and Ben Vereen, directed by Daniel Sullivan. Off-Broadway credits include The Director' with John Shea.  Her Liquid Light sculptures have been featured in galleries, museums and private collections in the U.S. and around the world.

Clarke also played the voice of Nicole Brennan in Dead Space.

Selected filmography

Television

Film

Video games

References

External links
 

American film actresses
American television actresses
American stage actresses
Living people
1972 births
21st-century American women